HIFK Fotboll or IFK Helsingfors is an association football section of HIFK, a sports club based in Helsinki, Finland. The men's football team competes in the highest tier of Finnish football, Veikkausliiga. Their home ground is the Bolt Arena.

History

Idrottsföreningen Kamraterna i Helsingfors was formed on 15 October 1897 by Georges Doubitsky, a 15-year-old student at the Svenska Reallyceum school in Helsinki. In those early years the club specialised in athletics, football and bandy. The football section was established in 1907, the same year that the Football Association of Finland was founded. The first football match played HIFK was at the Kaisaniemi ground on 17 May 1908 where the new team lost 1–2 to Unitas.

In those early years HIFK were runners-up in the Mestaruussarja (then played as a cup competition) on 5 occasions in 1909, 1912, 1928 and 1929. In addition in 1912 the Finnish Football team at the Stockholm Olympics comprised a team of HIFK players.

HIFK won their first Finnish championship (Mestaruussarja) in 1930 a feat that they were to repeat on three other occasions in 1931, 1933 and 1937 in a tremendous decade for the club.  HIFK also won the Mestaruussarja in 1947, 1959 and 1961. In total HIFK won the Finnish championship on 7 occasions.

HIFK was one of the most successful football sides in Finland until the early 1970s when the team were relegated from the Mestaruussarja (Finnish Premier League). After 1972 the team wandered around the lower divisions of Finnish football, having even played in the Nelonen (Fourth Division), the fifth tier of the Finnish football league system, in 1980–83 and 2003–05, and only would return to the first level 43 years later.

In total, since 1930, HIFK have played 33 seasons in the Mestaruussarja (the top tier), 22 seasons in the second tier and 19 seasons in the third tier.  Their best spell in recent decades was from 1999 to 2002 when the club participated in the Ykkönen (First Division). However, the club overstretched themselves which resulted in the withdrawal from the Ykkönen at the end of the 2002 season and taking the place of the second team in the Nelonen (Fourth Division) in 2003. More recently, in 2010, they won the third tier, after defeating FC Santa Claus in the promotion playoff match, returning them to the second-tier Ykkönen of Finnish football for seasons 2011 and 2012, only to be relegated back to Kakkonen after their 2012 season. Back in Kakkonen, HIFK rehired coach Jani Honkavaara who was the coach when HIFK first were promoted to Ykkönen. Since his second term they were able to play in Ykkönen for a third time this millennia, when beating their promotion play-off opponent PS Kemi Kings.

HIFK won Ykkönen in 2014 and thereby were automatically promoted into the highest tier of Finnish football, Veikkausliiga. After securing their promotion, HIFK announced that they would play their 2015 season home games on Telia 5G -areena, the home ground of their local rivals HJK Helsinki. In December 2014 HIFK launched a crowdfunding campaign through Invesdor. HIFK aimed to gather 250.000 – 500.000 euros by selling shares of the club valued at 189,70 euros a piece. According to club chairman René Österman, HIFK was in need of funding for the upcoming Veikkausliiga season and crowdfunding gave a chance for the club's supporters to own a part of the club. The campaign ended successfully in January 2015 and HIFK gathered 335.495 euros from 786 investors.

After three seasons in Veikkausliiga, HIFK were relegated to Ykkönen after finishing 11th in 2017 season and losing relegation play-offs against FC Honka on away goals. However, after a successful 2018 campaign in Ykkönen, HIFK was promoted back to Veikkausliiga for the 2019 season.

European campaigns

HIFK participated in the European Cup in the 1960–61 and 1962–63 seasons and played in the UEFA cup in 1971–72.

Honours
Mestaruussarja
  Champions (7): 1930, 1931, 1933, 1937, 1947, 1959, 1961
 Runners-up (7): 1909, 1912, 1928, 1929, 1934, 1935, 1971

Attendance Record: 10,500 (HIFK – HJK, Telia 5G -areena, 10 August 2016)

Divisional movements since 1930

Top Level (32 seasons): 1930–45, 1947–49, 1958–66, 1970–72, 2015–2017, 2019-2022
Second Level (23 seasons): 1945–46, 1950–57, 1967–69, 1973–74, 1999–02, 2011–12, 2014, 2018, 2023
Third Level (19 seasons): 1975–78, 1988–98, 2008–10, 2013

Season to season

|}

Supporters and rivalries

Historically, HIFK was primarily the club for the Swedish-speaking population in Helsinki. However, the club nowadays is bilingual and language doesn't play an important role in the club anymore. Nowadays, the most renowned supporter group of the club is Stadin Kingit (in English: "the kings of Stadi"). Its name derives from the common slang nickname for Helsinki (Stadi). Many members attend the handball, bandy and ice hockey matches of HIFK as well.

The single most important fixture for HIFK supporters is the one against the major local rivals, HJK. The fixture is commonly known as Stadin derby.

Club structure

HIFK Fotboll run a large number of teams including 3 men's teams, 3 women's teams, 1 men's veterans team, 16 boys' teams and 5 girls' teams.

HIFK (Men's First Team) are competing in Veikkausliiga.  This is the highest tier in the Finnish football system.
 HIFK / 2 are competing in Group B of Kolmonen (Fourth tier) administered by the SPL Uusimaa. 
  HIFK / 3 are competing in Group 4 of Kutonen (Seventh tier) administered by the SPL Uusimaa.

Updated as of season 2022.

Players
As of 17 July 2022

Current squad

Out on loan

Management and boardroomManagement

As of 20 April 2022

Boardroom

References

External links
 Official football website
 Official club website
Team info at GSA

 
Football clubs in Finland
Association football clubs established in 1897
1897 establishments in Finland
Sports clubs in Helsinki
football